Dräger or Draeger may refer to
 Dräger (surname)
 Dräger (company), a German company which makes breathing and protection equipment, gas detection and analysis systems, and noninvasive patient monitoring technologies.
Mount Draeger in Antarctica